Gunion is a surname. Notable people with the surname include:

John F. Gunion (born 1943), American physicist
John Gunion Rutherford (1857–1923), Canadian veterinarian, civil servant, and politician
William Gunion Rutherford (1853–1907), Scottish scholar

See also
Gunton (surname)